Prince Sahle Selassie (27 February 1932 – 24 April 1962) was the youngest child of Emperor Haile Selassie and Empress Menen Asfaw of Ethiopia. His full title was "His Imperial Highness, Prince Sahle Selassie Haile Selassie".

Biography
Born after his parents had been crowned Emperor and Empress of Ethiopia, he was the only one of the Emperor's children to have been born with the title of Prince. Since his older brothers, Prince Asfa Wossen and Prince Makonnen, had both been born before the 1930 coronation, Prince Sahle Selassie was also the first legitimate child born to a reigning Emperor since the birth of Dejazmach Alemayehu Tewodros, son of Emperor Tewodros II.

Prince Sahle Selassie was married to Princess Mahisente Habte Mariam, the daughter of Dejazmach Habte Mariam Gabre-Igziabiher, the heir to the old Oromo kingdom of Leqa Naqamte in Welega Province, and later served as governor of Welega province. They had a son, Prince Ermias Sahle Selassie, who currently is the President of the Crown Council of Ethiopia. The Prince was a man of an artistic bent, who is said to have made a movie which was banned from publication by the Imperial Government censor despite the fact the Prince was a member of the Imperial family. It was believed that the movie indirectly questioned the fast pace of development, and the strains it caused on rural society, and was thus unflattering to the policies of the Imperial government.

Prince Sahle Selassie died in 1962, months after the death of his mother Empress Menen Asfaw. He was survived by his wife and his son Prince Ermias, and was buried in the crypt of Holy Trinity Cathedral in Addis Ababa.

Honours

National honours 
 Grand Cordon of the Order of the Seal of Solomon.
 Refugee Medal (1944).
 Jubilee Medal (1955).

Foreign honours 
 Grand Cross of the Order of the White Lion (Czechoslovakia, 14 December 1959).
 Knight of the Royal Order of the Seraphim (Kingdom of Sweden, 19 December 1959).
 Knight Grand Cordon of the Supreme Order of the Chrysanthemum (Japan).
 Knight Grand Cross of the Order of the House of Orange (Kingdom of the Netherlands).
 Knight Grand Cross of the Order of Merit of the Federal Republic of Germany (Federal Republic of Germany, 1955).
 Sash of the Order of the Aztec Eagle (United Mexican States, 1954).
 Order of the Yugoslav Star, 1st class (21 July 1954).
 Knight Grand Cordon of the Order of the Pioneers of Liberia (Republic of Liberia).

Ancestry

References

External links
 Photograph of Prince Sahle Selassie.

1932 births
1962 deaths
Ethiopian Royal Family
Ethiopian princes
Burials at Holy Trinity Cathedral (Addis Ababa)
Grand Crosses of the Order of the White Lion
Grand Crosses of the Order of the House of Orange
Grand Crosses 1st class of the Order of Merit of the Federal Republic of Germany
Haile Selassie
Sons of emperors